Baix Pallars is a town and municipality in the comarca of Pallars Sobirà, Catalonia, northern Spain.

The village of Gerri de la Sal is the administrative center of the municipality and home to the medieval monastery of Santa Maria de Gerri.

History
The Baix Pallars municipality was established in 1969 with the merger of the Baén, Gerri de la Sal, Montcortès de Pallars and Peramea municipalities.

Villages
The municipality includes the following villages and hamlets with their respective population.
Ancs, 3 inhabitants
Baén, 15 inhabitants
Balestui, 10 inhabitants
Bresca, 17 inhabitants
Bretui, 16 inhabitants
Buseu, 1 inhabitant
Canals, 0 inhabitants
Cabestany, 2 inhabitants
Castellnou de Peramea, 2 inhabitants
El Comte, 3 inhabitants
Cortscastell, 4 inhabitants
Cuberes, 0 inhabitants
L'Espluga de Cuberes, 0 inhabitants
Enseu, 4 inhabitants
Gerri de la Sal, 136 inhabitants
Masies de Llaràs, 8 inhabitants
Mentui, 5 inhabitants
Montcortès, 25 inhabitants
Peracalç, 11 inhabitants
Peramea, 78 inhabitants
El Pui, 0 inhabitants
Pujol, 19 inhabitants
Sant Sebastià de Buseu, 0 inhabitants
Sarroca, 2 inhabitants
Sellui, 15 inhabitants
El Soi, 0 inhabitants
Solduga, 1 inhabitant
Useu, 8 inhabitants
Vilesa, 0 inhabitants

See also
Pallars

References

External links
 Government data pages 

Municipalities in Pallars Sobirà
Populated places in Pallars Sobirà